René Oosterhof (born 1 May 1990) is a Dutch footballer who formerly played for FC Zwolle, SC Heerenveen and AGOVV Apeldoorn.

References
Profile

1990 births
Living people
Sportspeople from Zwolle
Dutch footballers
Eredivisie players
Eerste Divisie players
PEC Zwolle players
SC Heerenveen players
AGOVV Apeldoorn players
Association football goalkeepers
Footballers from Overijssel